The MMK Metallurgy is a multi-national steelmaking company established 2007 in Iskenderun, southern Turkey. Company's main plant, located in Dörtyol, began production in 2011 after three years of construction time. The total investment is worth of $2.7 billion.

An agreement to found a joint venture company for manufacturing flat steel products was signed on May 23, 2007 in Iskenderun between Viktor Filippovich Rashnikov, chairman of the Russian steelmaking company  Magnitogorsk Iron and Steel Works (MMK) and Recep Atakaş, chairman of the Turkish Atakaş Group of Companies.

Already in the beginning of 2009, plant's service center consisting of a hot shear line, and a combined cold shear and slitting line went in operation. The construction of the plant was completed in 2010, and it was officially opened by the Turkish Prime Minister Recep Tayyip Erdoğan on March 9, 2011. The construction of another plant is planned in Istanbul.

The Italian company Danieli provided the key process equipment required. The company employs about 2,500 people.

As stated by Victor Rashnikov, the production is planned mainly for the domestic market. However, exportation into countries in Europe and Middle East are in consideration.

The seaport is since April 5, 2010 in operation.

Plant
The steel plant consists of five product lines at three facilities, in Dörtyol, Iskenderun and Istanbul, for the processing of different flat steel products:

Service center
Two service centers are in operation, in Iskenderun and Istanbul. They are equipped with a hot shear line and a combined cold shear and slitting line. At the hot shear line, steel coils of  thickness and  width can be cut to sheets of  length.

Color coating line
At this line, yearly  coils of  thickness and  width can be color coated. The color coating line went in operation by January 2010.

Hot dip galvanizing line
At the hot dip galvanizing line, coils with   thickness and  width can be processed.

Continuous pickling line
At the continuous pickling line located in Iskenderun, coils of  thickness and  width can be processed for pickling.

Cold reversing mill
Steel coils of  thickness and  width can be cold reversed at the mill in Iskenderun.

References

Turkish companies established in 2007
Multinational joint-venture companies
Steel companies of Russia
Steel companies of Turkey
Economy of Hatay